Kut is a village in the Vardenis Municipality of the Gegharkunik Province of Armenia.

References

External links 
 
 

Populated places in Gegharkunik Province
Populated places established in 1801